Robiquetia gracilistipes, commonly known as the large pouched orchid, is an epiphytic or lithophytic orchid from the family Orchidaceae that forms large, hanging, straggly clumps. It has long, thick, roots, a single stem, many thick, leathery leaves and up to forty cream-coloured, pale green or brownish flowers with red spots and a three-lobed labellum. It grows on trees and rocks in rainforest, usually in bright light. It is found in Malesia including New Guinea, the Solomon Islands and tropical North Queensland, Australia.

Description
Robiquetia gracilistipes is an epiphytic or lithophytic herb that forms large, straggly hanging clumps. Flowering occurs from March to May.

Taxonomy and naming
The large pouched orchid was first formally described in 1905 by Rudolf Schlechter who gave it the name Saccolabium gracilistipes and published the description in Die Flora der Deutschen Schutzgebiete in der Sudsee und Nachtrage. In 1912 Johannes Jacobus Smith changed the name to Robiquetia gracilistipes. The specific epithet (gracilistipes) is derived from the Latin word gracilis meaning "slender" or "thin" and stipes meaning "stock", "stem" or "trunk".

Distribution and habitat
The large pouched orchid grows on trees and rocks in rainforest, usually in strong light. It occurs in Malesia, including New Guinea, the Solomon Islands and Queensland, Australia where it is found from the Iron Range to Ingham.

References

grcilistipes
Epiphytic orchids
Endemic orchids of Australia
Orchids of Queensland
Orchids of New Guinea
Plants described in 1905